Boettger's wall gecko (Tarentola boettgeri), also commonly known as the Gran Canaria gecko, is a species of lizard in the family Phyllodactylidae. The species is native to the Canary Islands and the Savage Islands. There are three recognized subspecies.

Etymology
The specific name, boettgeri, is in honor of German herpetologist Oskar Boettger. The subspecific name, bischoffi, is in honor of German herpetologist Wolfgang Bischoff.

Geographic range
T. boettgeri is native to the islands of Gran Canaria (T. b. boettgeri) and El Hierro (T. b. hierrensis) in the Canary Islands. An introduced population exists in Galicia, Spain. The subspecies T. b. bischoffi is indigenous to the Savage Islands.

Habitat
The preferred habitats of T. boettgeri are shrubby vegetation, rocky areas, rocky shores, and rural gardens.

Reproduction
T. boettgeri is oviparous.

Subspecies
The following three subspecies are recognized as being valid, including the nominotypical subspecies.
Tarentola boettgeri bischoffi 
Tarentola boettgeri boettgeri 
Tarentola boettgeri hierrensis

References

Further reading
Steindachner F (1891). "Ueber die Reptilien und Batrachier der westlichen und östlichen Gruppe der canarischen Inseln ". Annalen des K. K. Naturhistorischens Hofmuseums, Wien 6: 287–306. (Tarentola delalandii var. boettgeri, new variety, p. 301). (in German).
Rösler H (2000). "Kommentierte Liste der rezent, subrezent und fossil bekannten Geckotaxa (Reptilia: Gekkonomorpha) ". Gekkota 2: 28–153. (in German).
Nogales M, López M, Jiménez-Asensio J, Larruga JM, Hernandez M, Gonzalez P (1998). "Evolution and biogeography of the genus Tarentola (Sauria: Gekkonidae) in the Canary Islands, inferred from mitochondrial DNA sequences". Journal of Evolutionary Biology 11: 481–494.
Krefft G (1949). "Beobachtungen an kanarischen Inseleidechsen. 4. Tarentola delalandei boettgeri". Wochenschr. Aquar. Terr. 5 (43): 114–116. (in German).
Joger U (1984). "Die Radiation der Gattung Tarentola in Makaronesien ". Courier Forschungsinstitut Senckenberg 71: 91–111. (in German).
Joger U, Bischoff W (1983). "Zwei neue Taxa der Gattung Tarentola (Reptilia: Sauria: Gekkonidae) von den Kanarischen Inseln ". Bonner Zoologische Beiträge 34 (1-3): 459–468. (in German).
Carranza S, Arnold EN, Mateo JA, López-Jurado LF (2000). "Long-distance colonization and radiation in gekkonid lizards, Tarentola (Reptilia: Gekkonidae), revealed by mitochondrial DNA sequences". Proceedings of the Royal Society of London, B, 267: 637–649.
Bonetti M (2002). 100 Sauri. Milan: Mondadori. 192 pp. . (in Italian).
Bischoff W (1985). "Die Herpetofauna der Kanarischen Inseln. II. Die Geckos der Gattung Tarentola". Herpetofauna 7 (35): 27–34. (in German).
Aulio R, Gérard P, Daoues K, Hussard N (2005). Atlas de la terrariophilie, Vol.3 : Les lézards. France: Animalia Éditions. 189 pp. . (in French).

Tarentola
Reptiles of the Canary Islands
Reptiles described in 1891
Taxonomy articles created by Polbot